The 8th United States Congress was a meeting of the legislative branch of the United States federal government, consisting of the United States Senate and the United States House of Representatives. It met in Washington, D.C. from March 4, 1803, to March 4, 1805, during the last two years of Thomas Jefferson's first term in office. The apportionment of seats in the House of Representatives was based on the 1800 United States census. Both chambers had a Democratic-Republican majority.

Major events

 April 30, 1803: Louisiana Purchase was made by the United States from France
 February 16, 1804: In the First Barbary War, Stephen Decatur led a raid to burn the pirate-held frigate Philadelphia
 May 14, 1804: Lewis and Clark Expedition departed from Camp Dubois to begin their historic journey by traveling up the Missouri River
 July 11, 1804: Aaron Burr killed Alexander Hamilton
 November 30, 1804: Impeachment trial of Supreme Court Justice Samuel Chase
 December 3, 1804: 1804 United States presidential election: Incumbent Thomas Jefferson (DR) beat challenger Charles Cotesworth Pinckney (F)
 March 1, 1805: Samuel Chase acquitted of impeachment charges by the U.S. Senate

Major legislation

Constitutional amendments 
 December 9, 1803: Approved an amendment to the United States Constitution providing a new procedure for electing the President and Vice President, and submitted it to the state legislatures for ratification 
 June 15, 1804: Twelfth Amendment was ratified by the requisite number of states (then 13) to become part of the Constitution

Treaties 
 October 20, 1803: Senate ratified the Louisiana Purchase Treaty

Territories organized
 March 26, 1804: Territory of Orleans was organized from the portion of the Louisiana Purchase south of the 33rd parallel; the portion north of the 33rd parallel was organized as the District of Louisiana. 
 January 11, 1805: Michigan Territory was organized. 
 March 3, 1805: Louisiana Territory was organized from the District of Louisiana.

Party summary
The count below identifies party affiliations at the beginning of the first session of this Congress, and includes members from vacancies and newly admitted states, when they were first seated. Changes resulting from subsequent replacements are shown below in the "Changes in membership" section.

Senate

House of Representatives 
Following the 1800 census, the size of the House was increased to 142 seats from 108.

Leadership

Senate 
 President: Aaron Burr (DR)
 President pro tempore: John Brown (DR), October 17, 1803 – February 26, 1804
 Jesse Franklin (DR), March 10, 1804 – November 4, 1804
 Joseph Anderson (DR), January 15, 1805 – December 1, 1805

House of Representatives 
 Speaker: Nathaniel Macon (DR)

Members
This list is arranged by chamber, then by state. Senators are listed in order of seniority, and representatives are listed by district.
Skip to House of Representatives, below

Senate
Senators were elected by the state legislatures every two years, with one-third beginning new six-year terms with each Congress. Preceding the names in the list below are Senate class numbers, which indicate the cycle of their election. In this Congress, Class 1 meant their term began with this Congress, requiring reelection in 1808; Class 2 meant their term ended in this Congress, requiring reelection in 1804; and Class 3 meant their term began in the last Congress, requiring reelection in 1806.

Connecticut 
 1. James Hillhouse (F)
 3. Uriah Tracy (F)

Delaware 
 1. Samuel White (F)
 2. William H. Wells (F), until November 6, 1804
 James A. Bayard (F), from November 13, 1804

Georgia 
 2. Abraham Baldwin (DR)
 3. James Jackson (DR)

Kentucky 
 2. John Brown (DR)
 3. John Breckinridge (DR)

Maryland 
 1. Samuel Smith (DR)
 3. Robert Wright (DR)

Massachusetts 
 1. John Quincy Adams (F)
 2. Timothy Pickering (F)

New Hampshire 
 2. Simeon Olcott (F)
 3. William Plumer (F)

New Jersey 
 1. John Condit (DR), from September 1, 1803
 2. Jonathan Dayton (F)

New York 
 1. Theodorus Bailey (DR), until January 16, 1804
 John Armstrong Jr. (DR), February 25, 1804 – June 30, 1804
 Samuel L. Mitchill (DR), from November 23, 1804
 3. DeWitt Clinton (DR), until November 4, 1803
 John Armstrong Jr. (DR), December 7, 1803 – February 23, 1804
 John Smith (DR), from February 23, 1804

North Carolina 
 2. Jesse Franklin (DR)
 3. David Stone (DR)

Ohio 
 1. John Smith (DR), from April 1, 1803
 3. Thomas Worthington (DR), from April 1, 1803

Pennsylvania 
 1. Samuel Maclay (DR)
 3. George Logan (DR)

Rhode Island 
 1. Samuel J. Potter (DR), until October 14, 1804
 Benjamin Howland (DR), from October 29, 1804
 2. Christopher Ellery (DR)

South Carolina 
 2. Thomas Sumter (DR)
 3. Pierce Butler (DR), resigned November 21, 1804
 John Gaillard (DR), from December 6, 1804

Tennessee 
 1. Joseph Anderson (DR), from September 22, 1803
 2. William Cocke (DR)

Vermont 
 1. Israel Smith (DR)
 3. Stephen R. Bradley (DR)

Virginia 
 1. Stevens T. Mason (DR), until May 10, 1803
 John Taylor (DR), June 4, 1803 – December 7, 1803
 Abraham B. Venable (DR), December 7, 1803 – June 7, 1804
 William B. Giles (DR), August 11, 1804 - December 4, 1804
 Andrew Moore (DR), from December 4, 1804
 2. Wilson C. Nicholas (DR), until May 22, 1804
 Andrew Moore (DR), August 11, 1804 – December 4, 1804
 William B. Giles (DR), from December 4, 1804

House of Representatives
The names of members of the House of Representatives are preceded by their district numbers.

Connecticut 
All representatives were elected statewide on a general ticket.
 . Simeon Baldwin (F), from September 5, 1803
 . Samuel W. Dana (F)
 . John Davenport (F)
 . Calvin Goddard (F)
 . Roger Griswold (F)
 . John Cotton Smith (F)
 . Benjamin Tallmadge (F)

Delaware 
 . Caesar A. Rodney (DR)

Georgia 
All representatives were elected statewide on a general ticket.
 . Joseph Bryan (DR)
 . Peter Early (DR)
 . Samuel Hammond (DR), until February 2, 1805, Vacant thereafter
 . David Meriwether (DR)

Kentucky 
 . Matthew Lyon (DR)
 . John Boyle (DR)
 . Matthew Walton (DR)
 . Thomas Sandford (DR)
 . John Fowler (DR)
 . George M. Bedinger (DR)

Maryland 
The 5th district was a plural district with two representatives.
 . John Campbell (F)
 . Walter Bowie (DR)
 . Thomas Plater (F)
 . Daniel Hiester (DR), until March 7, 1804
 Roger Nelson (DR), from November 6, 1804
 . William McCreery (DR)
 . Nicholas R. Moore (DR)
 . John Archer (DR)
 . Joseph H. Nicholson (DR)
 . John Dennis (F)

Massachusetts 
 . William Eustis (DR)
 . Jacob Crowninshield (DR)
 . Manasseh Cutler (F)
 . Joseph Bradley Varnum (DR)
 . Thomas Dwight (F)
 . Samuel Taggart (F)
 . Nahum Mitchell (F)
 . Lemuel Williams (F)
 . Phanuel Bishop (DR)
 . Seth Hastings (F)
 . William Stedman (F)
 . Thomson J. Skinner (DR), until August 10, 1804
 Simon Larned (DR), from November 5, 1804
 . Ebenezer Seaver (DR)
 . Richard Cutts (DR)
 . Peleg Wadsworth (F)
 . Samuel Thatcher (F)
 . Phineas Bruce (F)

New Hampshire 
All representatives were elected statewide on a general ticket.
 . Silas Betton (F)
 . Clifton Clagett (F)
 . David Hough (F)
 . Samuel Hunt (F)
 . Samuel Tenney (F)

New Jersey 
All representatives were elected statewide on a general ticket.
 . Adam Boyd (DR)
 . Ebenezer Elmer (DR)
 . William Helms (DR)
 . James Mott (DR)
 . James Sloan (DR)
 . Henry Southard (DR)

New York 
 . John Smith (DR), until February 23, 1804
 Samuel Riker (DR), from November 5, 1804
 . Joshua Sands (F)
 . Samuel L. Mitchill (DR), until November 22, 1804
 George Clinton Jr. (DR), from February 14, 1805
 . Philip Van Cortlandt (DR)
 . Andrew McCord (DR)
 . Isaac Bloom (DR), until April 26, 1803
 Daniel C. Verplanck (DR), from October 17, 1803
 . Josiah Hasbrouck (DR), from October 17, 1803
 . Henry W. Livingston (F)
 . Killian K. Van Rensselaer (F)
 . George Tibbits (F)
 . Beriah Palmer (DR)
 . David Thomas (DR)
 . Thomas Sammons (DR)
 . Erastus Root (DR)
 . Gaylord Griswold (F)
 . John Paterson (DR)
 . Oliver Phelps (DR)

North Carolina 
 . Thomas Wynns (DR)
 . Willis Alston (DR)
 . William Kennedy (DR)
 . William Blackledge (DR)
 . James Gillespie (DR), until January 11, 1805; vacant thereafter
 . Nathaniel Macon (DR)
 . Samuel D. Purviance (F)
 . Richard Stanford (DR)
 . Marmaduke Williams (DR)
 . Nathaniel Alexander (DR)
 . James Holland (DR)
 . Joseph Winston (DR)

Ohio 
 . Jeremiah Morrow (DR), from October 17, 1803

Pennsylvania 
There were four plural districts, the 1st, 2nd, & 3rd had three representatives each, the 4th had two representatives.
 . Joseph Clay (DR)
 . Michael Leib (DR)
 . Jacob Richards (DR)
 . Robert Brown (DR)
 . Frederick Conrad (DR)
 . Isaac Van Horne (DR)
 . Isaac Anderson (DR)
 . Joseph Hiester (DR)
 . John Whitehill (DR)
 . David Bard (DR)
 . John A. Hanna (DR)
 . Andrew Gregg (DR)
 . John Stewart (DR)
 . John Rea (DR)
 . William Findley (DR)
 . John Smilie (DR)
 . William Hoge (DR), until October 15, 1804
 John Hoge (DR), from November 2, 1804
 . John B. C. Lucas (DR)

Rhode Island 
Both representatives were elected statewide on a general ticket.
 . Nehemiah Knight (DR)
 . Joseph Stanton Jr. (DR)

South Carolina 
 . Thomas Lowndes (F)
 . William Butler Sr. (DR)
 . Benjamin Huger (F)
 . Wade Hampton (DR)
 . Richard Winn (DR)
 . Levi Casey (DR)
 . Thomas Moore (DR)
 . John B. Earle (DR)

Tennessee 
All representatives were elected statewide on a general ticket.
 . George W. Campbell (DR)
 . William Dickson (DR)
 . John Rhea (DR)

Vermont 
 . Gideon Olin (DR)
 . James Elliott (F)
 . William Chamberlain (F)
 . Martin Chittenden (F)

Virginia 
 . John G. Jackson (DR)
 . James Stephenson (F)
 . John Smith (DR)
 . David Holmes (DR)
 . Thomas Lewis Jr. (F), until March 5, 1804
 Andrew Moore (DR), March 5, 1804 – August 11, 1804
 Alexander Wilson (DR), from December 4, 1804
 . Abram Trigg (DR)
 . Joseph Lewis Jr. (F)
 . Walter Jones (DR)
 . Philip R. Thompson (DR)
 . John Dawson (DR)
 . Anthony New (DR)
 . Thomas Griffin (F)
 . John J. Trigg (DR), until May 17, 1804
 Christopher H. Clark (DR), from November 5, 1804
 . Matthew Clay (DR)
 . John Randolph (DR)
 . John W. Eppes (DR)
 . Thomas Claiborne (DR)
 . Peterson Goodwyn (DR)
 . Edwin Gray (DR)
 . Thomas Newton Jr. (DR)
 . Thomas M. Randolph (DR)
 . John Clopton (DR)

Non-voting members 
 . William Lattimore

Changes in membership
The count below reflects changes from the beginning of the first session of this Congress.

Senate 

|-
| Ohio(1)
| Vacant
| Failure to elect
|  | John Smith (DR)
| Seated April 1, 1803

|-
| Ohio(3)
| Vacant
| Failure to elect
|  | Thomas Worthington (DR)
| Seated April 1, 1803

|-
| New Jersey(1)
| Vacant
| Failure to elect
|  | John Condit (DR)
| Seated September 1, 1803

|-
| Tennessee(1)
| Vacant
| Failure to elect
|  | Joseph Anderson (DR)
| Elected September 22, 1803

|-
| Virginia(1)
|  | Stevens T. Mason (DR)
| Died May 10, 1803
|  | John Taylor (DR)
| Appointed June 4, 1803

|-
| New York(3)
|  | DeWitt Clinton (DR)
| Resigned November 4, 1803, to become Mayor of New York City
|  | John Armstrong Jr. (DR)
| Appointed December 7, 1803

|-
| Virginia(1)
|  | John Taylor (DR)
| Successor elected December 7, 1803
|  | Abraham B. Venable (DR)
| Elected December 7, 1803

|-
| New York(1)
|  | Theodorus Bailey (DR)
| Resigned January 16, 1804, to become Postmaster of New York City
|  | John Armstrong Jr. (DR)
| Seated February 25, 1804

|-
| New York(3)
|  | John Armstrong Jr. (DR)
| Successor elected February 23, 1804
|  | John Smith (DR)
| Elected February 23, 1804

|-
| Virginia(2)
|  | Wilson C. Nicholas (DR)
| Resigned May 22, 1804, to become Collector of Port of Norfolk
|  | Andrew Moore (DR)
| Appointed August 11, 1804

|-
| Virginia(1)
|  | Abraham B. Venable (DR)
| Resigned June 7, 1804
|  | William B. Giles (DR)
| Appointed August 11, 1804

|-
| New York(1)
|  | John Armstrong Jr. (DR)
| Resigned June 30, 1804, after being appointed Minister to France
|  | Samuel Latham Mitchill (DR)
| Seated November 23, 1804

|-
| Rhode Island(1)
|  | Samuel J. Potter (DR)
| Died October 14, 1804
|  | Benjamin Howland (DR)
| Seated October 29, 1804

|-
| Delaware(2)
|  | William H. Wells (F)
| Resigned November 6, 1804
|  | James A. Bayard (F)
| Seated November 13, 1804

|-
| South Carolina(3)
|  | Pierce Butler (DR)
| Resigned November 21, 1804
|  | John Gaillard (DR)
| Seated December 6, 1804

|-
| Virginia(1)
|  | William B. Giles (DR)
| Successor elected December 4, 1804
|  | Andrew Moore (DR)
| Elected December 4, 1804

|-
| Virginia(2)
|  | Andrew Moore (DR)
| Successor elected December 4, 1804
|  | William B. Giles (DR)
| Elected December 4, 1804

|}

House of Representatives 

|-
| 
| Vacant
| John Cantine (DR) was elected, but resigned before the Congress began.
|  | Josiah Hasbrouck (DR)
| October 17, 1803

|-
| 
| Vacant
| nowrap | Incumbent Elias Perkins (F) elected but chose not to serve.Successor elected September 5, 1803.
|  | Simeon Baldwin (F)
| October 17, 1803

|-
| 
| Vacant
| Seat vacant following Ohio's admission to Union until special election held on June 21, 1803.
|  | Jeremiah Morrow (DR)
| October 17, 1803

|-
| 
|  | Isaac Bloom (DR)
| Died April 26, 1803
|  | Daniel C. Verplanck (DR)
| October 17, 1803

|-
| 
|  | John Smith (DR)
| Resigned February 23, 1804, after being elected to U.S. Senate
|  | Samuel Riker (DR)
| November 5, 1804

|-
| 
|  | Thomas Lewis Jr. (F)
| Lost contested election March 5, 1804
|  | Andrew Moore (DR)
| March 5, 1804

|-
| 
|  | Daniel Hiester (DR)
| Died March 7, 1804
|  | Roger Nelson (DR)
| November 6, 1804

|-
| 
|  | John J. Trigg (DR)
| Died May 17, 1804
|  | Christopher H. Clark (DR)
| November 5, 1804

|-
| 
|  | Thomson J. Skinner (DR)
| Resigned August 10, 1804
|  | Simon Larned (DR)
| November 5, 1804

|-
| 
|  | Andrew Moore (DR)
| Resigned August 11, 1804, after being appointed to U.S. Senate
|  | Alexander Wilson (DR)
| December 4, 1804

|-
| 
|  | William Hoge (DR)
| Resigned October 15, 1804
|  | John Hoge (DR)
| November 2, 1804

|-
| 
|  | Samuel L. Mitchill (DR)
| Resigned November 22, 1804, after being elected to U.S. Senate
|  | George Clinton Jr. (DR)
| February 14, 1805

|-
| 
|  | James Gillespie (DR)
| Died January 11, 1805
| Vacant
| Not filled for remainder of term

|-
| 
|  | Samuel Hammond (DR)
| Resigned February 2, 1805, after becoming Civil and Military Governor of the Upper Louisiana Territory
| Vacant
| Not filled for remainder of term

|}

Committees
Lists of committees and their party leaders.

Senate

 Whole

House of Representatives

 Claims (Chairman: John C. Smith then Samuel W. Dana)
 Commerce and Manufactures (Chairman: Samuel L. Mitchill)
 Elections (Chairman: William Findley)
 Revisal and Unfinished Business (Chairman: Samuel Tenney)
 Rules (Select) 
 Standards of Official Conduct 
 Ways and Means (Chairman: John Randolph)
 Whole

Joint committees

 Enrolled Bills (Chairman: N/A)

Officers

Legislative branch agency directors 
Architect of the Capitol: Benjamin H. Latrobe, appointed March 6, 1803
Librarian of Congress: John J. Beckley

Senate 
Secretary: Samuel A. Otis
Sergeant at Arms: James Mathers
Chaplain: Edward Gantt, Episcopalian, until November 7, 1804
 Alexander T. McCormick, Episcopalian, elected November 7, 1804

House of Representatives 
Clerk: John Beckley
Sergeant at Arms: Joseph Wheaton
Doorkeeper: Thomas Claxton
Chaplain: William Parkinson, Baptist, until November 5, 1804
 The Rev. James Laurie, Presbyterian, elected November 5, 1804
 Reading Clerks:

See also 
 1802 United States elections (elections leading to this Congress)
 1802–03 United States Senate elections
 1802–03 United States House of Representatives elections
 1804 United States elections (elections during this Congress, leading to the next Congress)
 1804 United States presidential election
 1804–05 United States Senate elections
 1804–05 United States House of Representatives elections

Notes

References

External links
Statutes at Large, 1789-1875
Senate Journal, First Forty-three Sessions of Congress
House Journal, First Forty-three Sessions of Congress
Biographical Directory of the U.S. Congress
U.S. House of Representatives: House History
U.S. Senate: Statistics and Lists